Maran or Maric is an extinct branch of the Pama–Nyungan family of Australian languages formerly spoken throughout much of Queensland by many of the Murri peoples. The well attested Maric languages are clearly related; however, many languages of the area became extinct before much could be documented of them, and their classification is uncertain. The clear Maric languages are:
Bidyara (numerous varieties)
Biri (several varieties)
Warrungu (& Gugu-Badhun, Gudjal)
(Kingkel?): Darumbal

Dharumbal was added by Bowern (2011); it had been classified in the Kingkel branch of Waka–Kabic.  It is not clear if the other Kingkel language, Bayali, is also Maric; Bayali and Darumbal are not close.

Unclassified languages
Ngaro and Giya (Bumbarra), spoken on the coast, may also have been Maric, the latter perhaps a dialect of Biri.

Of the interior, to the west, Breen (2007) writes of "Karna–Mari fringe" languages which are "a discontinuous group of languages, mostly poorly attested, scattered between Karnic and Mari languages but not showing much connection with either or with one another. The only one well attested is also the most remote geographically, Kalkutungu". This includes the Ngura languages, several of which belong to the Karnic branch of Pama–Nyungan (such as the Wilson River dialects spoken by the Galali and Wangkumara, though not the Bulloo River dialects spoken by the same). However, Bowern (2011) lists the Badjiri variety as Maric. Other poorly attested interior languages which may have been Maric include Ngaygungu (Dixon 2002), Bindal (Bowern 2011), Barna (Bowern 2011), Dhungaloo (doubtful in Bowern, not listed at AIATSIS), and Yirandhali (Dixon, Bowern).  Yiman near the coast was ethnically Bidjara. Dixon's "Greater Maric" area listed in Bowern (2011) also includes Guwa (Goa) and Yanda. See also Karnic languages for additional varieties from the area.

See also
Pama–Maran languages

References 

 
Indigenous Australian languages in Queensland